No Greater Love (NGL) is an American humanitarian, non-profit organization founded in 1971 by Carmella Laspada and is dedicated to providing programs such as wreath-layings, remembrance tributes, and memorial dedications, for those who have lost a loved one in the service to the country or by an act of terrorism. To date, NGL has dedicated 11 memorials located in Arlington National Cemetery and sponsors numerous other programs.  The name is derived from the verse John 15:13 from the Bible.

Origin 

As a White House Special Projects Aide during the Vietnam War, Ms. LaSpada organized a USO tour to Southeast Asia with her friend, the journalist and humorist, Art Buchwald. Visiting a military hospital, she met a battle-injured medic who had seen 35 men in his unit die before he himself was mortally wounded.  The young man asked that she promise to do something so that his comrades and their grieving families would be remembered.  She agreed, accepting from him a black scarf - a symbol of his unit - to seal her promise.

Programs 

NGL has initiated many programs to encourage remembrance and increase morale of those affected by war:

The annual National Moment of Remembrance, initiated in 1997. All Americans are asked to pause at 3:00 p.m. (local time) on Memorial Day to observe a moment of silence to honor those who have died for freedom. The National Moment of Remembrance was formally established by an act of Congress on December 28, 2000 and is now sponsored by the White House Commission on Remembrance.
First National Salute to Hospitalized Veterans initiated in 1974. The United States Department of Veterans Affairs now sponsors this annual program.
Holiday Remembrance Gifts Send-Off, begun in 1971, an annual tradition of sending holiday gifts to children who have lost a parent to war.
Annual Tribute to Those Who Died in the Gulf War, begun in 1992 with the cooperation of the people of Kuwait, is the only tribute that brings together annually families whose loved ones died in the Persian Gulf.
Pledge of Peace, created in 1985 and was recognized by the United Nations and is recited by children at most NGL events.
Operation Valentine initiated in 1993 to boost the morale of U.S. troops on peacekeeping missions by having children send homemade valentines to the troops.
Yellow Ribbon Campaign. When Americans were taken hostage in Iran in 1979, the wearing of a yellow ribbon was a symbol of America's shared concern for those being denied their freedom.
International Commemoration for all Victims of Terrorism, begun in 1984, the only tribute in the world specifically for victims of terrorism.
Editor's Choice Awards, started in 1976, was the first organized national recognition of Vietnam War veterans for their post-war contributions to the nation.

External links 

No Greater Love

Charities based in Washington, D.C.